Warraq is the Arabic word for stationer or papermaker.

Warraq may also refer to:
El Warraq, a municipal division and island on the Nile in Egypt

People with the surname
Abu Bakr al-Warraq, 9th-century gnostic and Sufi sheikh
Abu Isa al-Warraq, 9th-century skeptical scholar
Yusuf al-Warraq, 9th-century Andalusian geographer
Ibn Sayyar al-Warraq, compiler of a tenth-century cookbook, al-Kitab al-Ṭabīḫ
Ibn al-Nadim al-Warraq, 10th-century Muslim bibliographer
Ibn Warraq, a critic of Islam

Arabic-language surnames